Aleksandar Đuričić (Cyrillic: Александар Ђуричић; Anglicised: Aleksandar Djuricic; also known as: Ash) is a young Serbian novelist and a playwright. Author of two novels Surf na crvenom talasu and Rekvijem za Adama, and play Marlon Monroe.

Biography 
Aleksandar Đuričić wrote his first play Ljubim vam dušu inspired by the life of actors and directors. After that, he wrote Civilizacija, a play about cataclysm and human nature.

He became a member of the Nova Drama group of young Serbian playwrights, also well esteemed member of Glembay Theatre. The publishing of Djuričić's first novel Surf na crvenom talasu in 2007 made him one of the youngest Serbian novelist ever published.

In 2010 he graduated from the University of Belgrade Faculty of Electrical Engineering. Same year his play "Marlon Monroe" was awarded as the best unpublished play on Slobodan Stojanović contest and printed.

Novels 
 Surf na crvenom talasu, 2007
 Rekvijem za Adama, 2015

Plays 
 Ljubim vam dušu, 2003
 Civilizacija, 2004
 Marlon Monroe, 2009

Screenplays 
 Letnje večeri, 2004
 Vonj, 2006
 Triznakinje, 2007

Short stories 
 Karmina i mesečeva reka, 2010 (Published in "Gradske priče" collection of short stories)
 Neprimetno, 2011 (Published in "Najkrace price 2011" collection of short stories)
 Leopoldov grad, 2012 (Published in "Crte i reze 4" collection)
 O toplim večerima, Kradeno vreme na poklon, 2012 (Published in "Jedan zivot u manje od devetsto znakova", collection of short stories)
 Viden (published in "Beležnica 24/25", 2012)
 Unutrašnji grad (“Silver Albatross” award, Bijela 2012, Montenegro)
 Slučaj udaje Srbijanke Jugović (Published in "Nušić po drugi put među Srbima", Ivanjica 2013)
 Želeti biti negde drugde ("Očitovanja", Dubrovnik 2013)
 Hicing (“Međaj”, Užice 2013)

External links 
 www.ash.rs Author's official page
 Aleksandar Đuričić Ash on IMDb
 Aleksandar Đuričić Ash on Knjizara.com

References 
 Interview with Aleksandar Đuričić Ash on southeast-europe.eu

1982 births
Living people
Serbian novelists
Serbian dramatists and playwrights
Serbian screenwriters
Male screenwriters
University of Belgrade School of Electrical Engineering alumni